The Toshin Golf Tournament was a professional golf tournament on the Japan Golf Tour from 2010 to 2014. It was played at the Toshin Lake Wood Golf Club in Tsu, Mie in 2010 and 2011. It moved to the Ryosen Golf Club in Inabe, Mie in 2012 and the Toshin Golf Club, Central Course in Tomika, Gifu in 2013. The purse for the 2014 event was ¥100,000,000, with ¥20,000,000 going to the winner.

In 2012, Wu Ashun defeated Yuta Ikeda in a sudden-death playoff to become the first Chinese winner on the Japan Golf Tour.

Tournament hosts

Winners

Notes

References

External links
Coverage on the Japan Golf Tour's official site

Former Japan Golf Tour events
Defunct golf tournaments in Japan
Recurring sporting events established in 2010
Recurring sporting events disestablished in 2014